Long Moh is a longhouse settlement in the Marudi division of Sarawak, Malaysia.

The village is located in the Ulu Baram area on the Baram River between Long Selaan (upstream) and Long Bela'ong (downstream).

The village belongs to the Kenyah people, an indigenous tribe in the Sarawak interior. The village was originally established when tribespeople of the Lepo'Tau subgroup moved to the area from the Silat River, and the people of Long Selaan gave an area of land to them. It is located at the confluence of a small stream with the larger Baram River, as is often the case with Kenyah villages.

Neighbouring settlements include:

References

Villages in Sarawak